Acanthaluteres is a genus of filefishes native to the Indian and Pacific Oceans.

Species
There are currently 3 recognized species in this genus:
 Acanthaluteres brownii J. Richardson, 1846 (Spiny-tailed leatherjacket)
 Acanthaluteres spilomelanurus Quoy & Gaimard, 1824 (Bridled leatherjacket)
 Acanthaluteres vittiger Castelnau, 1873 (Toothbrush leatherjacket)

References

Monacanthidae
Marine fish genera
Taxa named by Pieter Bleeker